The Journal of Economics & Management Strategy is a quarterly peer-reviewed academic journal published by John Wiley & Sons. The founding editor-in-chief is Daniel F. Spulber (Kellogg School of Management, Northwestern University) and Ramon Casadesus-Masanell (Harvard Business School). The journal was established in 1992.

Abstracting and indexing 
The journal is abstracted and indexed in:

According to the Journal Citation Reports, the journal has a 2020 impact factor of 1.871.

References

External links
 

Economics journals
Business and management journals
Wiley (publisher) academic journals
Publications established in 1992
Quarterly journals
English-language journals